Dollah Salleh (born 10 October 1963) is a Malaysian football coach and former player. He is well-known to MSL fans as Pablo Dollah. One of Malaysia's most decorated players, he has also been manager of Malaysia's national team.

Playing career 
Dollah was one of Malaysia's top footballers in the 1980s and 90s. With striking partner Zainal Abidin Hassan, the two were regarded as the twin strikers by fans. Dollah first played in Malaysian football in 1982. At that time he represented Johor, which was one of the teams in the semi-pro era. When Dollah joined Selangor in 1987, a new twin striker was born after the era of Hassan Sani and James Wong. He and Zainal became a fierce striking duo for both Selangor and the Malaysia national team. In 1991, he left Selangor to join Pahang with Zainal and Singapore football star Fandi Ahmad where they created a 'dream team', winning both the league and Malaysia Cup in 1992.

With the national team, Dollah won the gold medal at the 1989 Southeast Asian Games. He also helped the national team to won the 1993 Merdeka Tournament by beating South Korea 3–1. Dollah also played in the first edition of ASEAN Football Championship, where the national team reached the final of the competition but lost 0–1 to Thailand. He also played for the Malaysia national futsal team, and was on the squad that took part in the 1996 FIFA Futsal World Championship in Spain. Dollah retired as a player after the 1998 season ended, last playing for Negeri Sembilan. Overall, Dollah had total 81 caps with 33 international goals for Malaysia. He has also been a influence on players such as Safee Sali and LJ Green.

Coaching career 
Dollah started his coaching career with Selangor MPPJ in 2003. The same year he guided the team to become the first-ever club to win the Malaysia Cup by beating Sabah 3–0. He later guided Selangor MPPJ to win the Malaysia Charity Shield and Malaysia Premier League in 2004. In 2005, Selangor signed a long deal with him. That year, Selangor won three trophies: the Malaysia Premier League, Malaysia FA Cup, and Malaysia Cup. However, in the 2005–06 season, Selangor failed to keep their momentum as they failed to win any trophy. Even though Selangor failed to win any trophy, Selangor kept Dollah in charge for the 2006–07 season. The 2007–08 season saw the revival of Selangor as they went through to the final of the Malaysia FA Cup and Malaysia Cup. However, they were beaten by Kedah with the same score line in the two finals. This failure saw Dollah let go by the management.

In the 2009 season, Dollah reunited with his old partner Zainal. This time they played the role of manager and coach for Kuantan Port-Shahzan Muda. In the middle of the 2009 season, he went on to coach Pahang, replacing Tajuddin Noor. After successfully helping Pahang lift its first Malaysia Cup in 21 years, Dollah signed on to coach PDRM for the 2014 season in the Malaysian second-tier league. In his only season with PDRM, he guided them to the 2014 Malaysia Premier League title and a promotion to the Super League.

Dollah was appointed as the new head coach of Malaysia national team in June 2014, signing a 2-year contract. He led Malaysia to second place in the 2014 AFF Championship. However, he received much criticism as he was responsible for twin 0–6 defeats at the hands of Palestine and Oman, and the team's failure to get three points against Timor Leste, Bangladesh and Hong Kong, and losing to Tajikistan and Syria that were once at the same standard as Malaysia earlier in 2014. On 3 September 2015, he had similar fate as Otto Rehhagel (12–0 loss), Aji Santoso (10–0 loss) and Luiz Felipe Scolari (1–7 loss) when his straw the largest record defeat of the national team, a 0–10 loss at the hands of the United Arab Emirates. This subsequently led him to resign as the head coach.

Honours (player)

Club 
Johor
 Winners: 1985 Malaysia Cup
 Winners: 1986 Malaysia Charity Shield

Selangor
 Winners: 1989, 1990 M-League
 Winners: 1987, 1990 Malaysia Charity Shield

Pahang
 Winners: 1992 Malaysia Premier League I, 1995 M-League
 Winners: 1992 Malaysia Cup
 Winners: 1992, 1993 Malaysia Charity Shield

International 
Malaysia
 Gold medal: 1989 Southeast Asian Games
 Winners: 1986, 1993 Merdeka Tournament

Achievements (coach)

Malaysia 
 Runners-up: 2014 AFF Championship

With Selangor MPPJ 
 Winners: 2003 Malaysia Cup
 Winners: 2004 Malaysia Premier League
 Winners: 2004 Malaysia Charity Shield

With Selangor 
 Winners: 2005 Malaysia Premier League
 Winners: 2005 Malaysia FA Cup
 Winners: 2005 Malaysia Cup

With Pahang 
 Runners-up:  2012 Malaysia Premier League
 Winners: 2013 Malaysia Cup
 Winner: 2018  Malaysia FA Cup

With PDRM 
 Winners: 2014 Malaysia Premier League

References

External links 
 

Living people
Malaysian people of Malay descent
Malaysian footballers
Malaysia international footballers
1963 births
Selangor FA players
Sri Pahang FC players
Malacca FA players
Negeri Sembilan FA players
People from Malacca
Footballers at the 1990 Asian Games
Malaysia national football team managers
Sri Pahang FC managers
Southeast Asian Games bronze medalists for Malaysia
Southeast Asian Games silver medalists for Malaysia
Southeast Asian Games gold medalists for Malaysia
Southeast Asian Games medalists in football
Association football forwards
Competitors at the 1989 Southeast Asian Games
Asian Games competitors for Malaysia
Malaysian football managers
Footballers at the 1994 Asian Games